The 3rd People's Choice Awards, honoring the best in popular culture for 1976, were held in 1977. They were broadcast on CBS.

Winners

Favorite All-Around Male Entertainer:
Bob Hope

Favorite Female TV Performer:
Mary Tyler Moore

Favorite TV Variety Program:
The Carol Burnett Show

Favorite Male Musical Performer:
John Denver

Favorite Motion Picture Actress:
Barbra Streisand

Favorite Overall New TV Program:
Charlie's Angels

Favorite All-Around Female Entertainer:
Carol Burnett

Favorite Motion Picture:
One Flew Over the Cuckoo's Nest

Favorite Female Performer in a New TV Program:
Farrah Fawcett

Favorite Male TV Performer:
Telly Savalas

Favorite TV Dramatic Program:
Starsky & Hutch

Favorite TV Comedy Program:
Happy Days

Favorite TV Special:
1976 Summer Olympics

Favorite Female Musical Performer:
Olivia Newton-John

Favorite Male Performer in a New TV Program:
Robert Conrad,
Dick Van Dyke

Favorite Motion Picture Actor:
John Wayne

Favorite New Song:
"Beth",
"Disco Duck"

References

People's Choice Awards
1976 awards
1977 in American television
1976 awards in the United States
February 1977 events in the United States